A tachistoscope is a device that displays an image for a specific amount of time. It can be used to increase recognition speed, to show something too fast to be consciously recognized, or to test which elements of an image are memorable.  Projection tachistoscopes use a slide or transparency projector equipped with the mechanical shutter system typical of a camera.  The slide is loaded, the shutter locked open, and focusing and alignment are adjusted, then the shutter is closed.  When ready for the test, a shutter speed is selected, and the shutter is tripped normally.

History 
The first tachistoscope was originally described by the German physiologist A.W. Volkmann in 1859. Samuel Renshaw used it during World War II in the training of fighter pilots to help them identify aircraft silhouettes as friend or foe.

Applications 
Before computers became universal, tachistoscopes were used extensively in psychological research to present visual stimuli for controlled durations. Some experiments employed pairs of tachistoscopes so that an experimental participant could be given different stimulation in each visual field.

Tachistoscopes were used during the late 1960s in public schools as an aid to increased reading comprehension for speed reading. There were two types: the student would look through a lens similar to an aircraft bombsight viewfinder and read letters, words and phrases using manually advanced slide film. The second type projected words and phrases on a screen in sequence. Both types were followed up with comprehension and vocabulary testing.

Tachistoscopes continue to be used in market research, where they are typically used to compare the visual impact, or memorability of marketing materials or packaging designs. Tachistoscopes used for this purpose still typically employ slide projectors rather than computer monitors, due to
 the increased fidelity of the image which can be displayed in this way and
 the opportunity to show large or life-size images.

References 

 Benschop, R. (1998).  "What Is a Tachistoscope?  Historical Explorations of an Instrument".  Science in Context, 11:23–50.

External links 
 How to Build and Use a Tachistoscope

Photography equipment
Optical devices